is a JR West railway station located in Masuda, Shimane Prefecture, Japan.

Railway stations in Japan opened in 1925
Railway stations in Shimane Prefecture
Sanin Main Line
Stations of West Japan Railway Company